Clair is a civil parish in Madawaska County, New Brunswick, Canada.

For governance purposes it is part of the incorporated rural community of Haut-Madawaska, which is a member of the Northwest Regional Service Commission (NWRSC).

Origin of name
Clair was named in honour of Peter Clair, an early immigrant from County Clare, Ireland.

History
Clair was erected in 1900 from Saint-François.

In 1912 Lac Baker Parish was erected from part of Clair; the boundary was slightly altered later that year.

Clair was affected by the major reorganisation of Madawaska County parish boundaries in 1946.

Boundaries
Clair Parish is bounded:

on the northeast and north, running entirely along grant lines, starting at a point about 1.35 kilometres northwest of Chemin des Long, on the northeastern line of Range Three of the Baker Lake Settlement, which is two tiers inland of the western side of Lac Baker, then running southeasterly to the northwestern corner of a triangular grant on Brown Road, then easterly and northeasterly along two Brown Road grants, then easterly along the Saint John River grants to a point about 1.2 kilometres east of Route 120;
on the east by the eastern line of a grant to John C. Ouellet and its prolongation to the international border in the Saint John River;
on the south by the international border;
on the west and northwest by a line beginning in the Saint John River on the prolongation of the western line of a grant to Edward Levasseur in Range Two, the Levasseur lot being on the western side of Levasseur Road at its northern end, then northerly along the prolongation through Range One (the river grants), the grant line, and the northerly prolongation to the northern line of Range Three, afterwards running entirely on grant lines, westerly along Range 3 to the southwestern line of Range Five of Baker Lake Settlement, then northwesterly along Range Five about 1.3 kilometres, then northeasterly to the southwestern line of Range Four, then northwesterly along Range Four about 2 kilometres, then northeasterly across Range Four and Range Three to the starting point.

Communities
Communities at least partly within the parish; bold indicates an incorporated municipality; italics indicate a name no longer in official use
Caron Brook 
Clair
Concession-des-Vasseur
Concession-des-Lang
Crockett
Les Rapides

Bodies of water
Bodies of water at least partly in the parish:
Saint John River
Thompson Lake

Demographics
Parish population total does not include former village of Clair. 2016 is the last census the parish was profiled in. Revised census figures based on the 2023 local governance reforms have not been released.

Population

Language

See also
List of parishes in New Brunswick

Notes

References

Parishes of Madawaska County, New Brunswick
Local service districts of Madawaska County, New Brunswick